Perak is the second-largest state in Peninsular Malaysia.

Perak may also refer to:
 Perak Malay, a dialect of Malay language
 Perak River
 Perak football team
 Tun Perak, a bendahara of the Sultanate of Malacca
 Pérák, the Spring Man of Prague, a figure from Czechoslovakian folklore
 Perak (headdress), worn by women in the Himalayan region
 Banknotes of the Chartered Bank of India, Australia and China (Perak)
 Silver is called Perak in Malay language